Grammichele (Greek: Echetle (meaning "plowshare"); Latin: Echetla, Ochula; Medieval: Occhiolà) is a town and comune in the Metropolitan City of Catania in Sicily, southern Italy.

History

The town was built in 1693, after the old town of Occhiolà, located to the north of the modern Grammichele, was destroyed by an earthquake. Occhiolà, on account of the similarity of name, is generally identified with Echetla, a frontier city between Syracusan and Carthaginian territory in the time of Hiero II, which appears to have been originally a Sicel city in which Greek civilization prevailed from the 5th century onwards.

The devastation of the old town was so severe that the feudal landlord of the town, Carlo Maria Carafa Branciforte, Prince of Butari, commissioned construction of a new town, with plans aided by Michele da Ferla. Supposedly the Prince himself sketched out the initial hexagonal layout. In the center of the hexagon is the Piazza Carlo Maria Carafa, faced by the Chiesa Madre (Mother Church), San Michele Arcangelo, and the Palazzo Communale (City Hall). The town of Avola, destroyed by the same earthquake, was also relocated and rebuilt along a hexagonal layout.

On July 15, 1943, the 1st Canadian Infantry Division fought its first battle with the Germans in Operation Husky against elements of Panzer Division "Hermann Goring". The Hastings and Prince Edward Regiment, Saskatoon Light Infantry (Machine Gun) and the Three Rivers Regiment (tank) all took part in the fighting, which concluded at midday with the town in Canadian hands.

Main sights
To the east of Grammichele a cave shrine of Demeter, with fine votive terracottas, was discovered. Other sights include the Mother Church; San Michele Arcangelo, dedicated to St. Michael; and the Church of Calvary.

References

Sources

Municipalities of the Metropolitan City of Catania
Planned cities in Italy